The 28th Toronto International Film Festival ran from September 4 to September 13, 2003.  A total of 336 films (252 feature length and 84 short films) from 55 countries were screened during the festival.  Of the feature films, 73% were world, international, or North American premieres.

Awards

Programmes

Viacom Galas
 Bon Voyage directed by Jean-Paul Rappeneau
 The Boys from County Clare directed by John Irvin
 Code 46 directed by Michael Winterbottom
 The Company directed by Robert Altman
 Danny Deckchair directed by Jeff Balsmeyer
 Girl with a Pearl Earring directed by Peter Webber
 Good Morning, Night directed by Marco Bellocchio
 The Human Stain directed by Robert Benton
 In the Cut directed by Jane Campion
 The Barbarian Invasions directed by Denys Arcand
 Mambo Italiano directed by Émile Gaudreault
 Matchstick Men directed by Ridley Scott
 Nathalie... directed by Anne Fontaine
 Out of Time directed by Carl Franklin
 The Republic of Love directed by Deepa Mehta
 Rosenstrasse directed by Margarethe von Trotta
 School of Rock directed by Richard Linklater
 Veronica Guerin directed by Joel Schumacher

Canadian Open Vault
 The Apprenticeship of Duddy Kravitz directed by Ted Kotcheff

Canadian Retrospective
 Back to God's Country directed by David M. Hartford
 A Bear, a Boy and a Dog directed by Bert Van Tuyle
 The Grub Stake directed by Bert Van Tuyle and Nell Shipman
 The Light on Lookout directed by Bert Van Tuyle and Nell Shipman
 Something New directed by Bert Van Tuyle and Nell Shipman
 The Story of Mr. Hobbs directed by Lorenzo Alagio
 The Trail of the North Wind directed by Nell Shipman
 White Water directed by Bert Van Tuyle and Nell Shipman

Contemporary World Cinema
 Abjad directed by Abolfazl Jalili
 Alexandra's Project directed by Rolf de Heer
 Antenna directed by Kazuyoshi Kumakiri
 At Five in the Afternoon directed by Samira Makhmalbaf
 B-Happy directed by Gonzalo Justiniano
 Bright Young Things directed by Stephen Fry
 Broken Wings directed by Nir Bergman
 Crimson Gold directed by Jafar Panahi
 Since Otar Left directed by Julie Bertuccelli
 Drifters directed by Wang Xiaoshuai
 Dummy directed by Greg Pritikin
 Errance directed by Damien Odoul
 The Event directed by Thom Fitzgerald
 Evil directed by Mikael Håfström
 Facing Windows directed by Ferzan Özpetek
 Forest directed by Benedek Fliegauf
 Böse Zellen directed by Barbara Albert
 Fuse directed by Pjer Žalica
 The Galíndez File directed by Gerardo Herrero
 Golden Chicken directed by Samson Chiu
 Good Bye, Lenin! directed by Wolfgang Becker
 A Good Lawyer's Wife directed by Im Sang-soo
 Grimm directed by Alex van Warmerdam
 Gun-Shy directed by Dito Tsintsadze
 Incantato directed by Pupi Avati
 The Hours of the Day directed by Jaime Rosales
 I'm Not Scared directed by Gabriele Salvatores
  directed by 
 In the City directed by Cesc Gay
 Intermission directed by John Crowley
 Interview directed by Theo van Gogh
 James' Journey to Jerusalem directed by Ra'anan Alexandrowicz
 Japanese Story directed by Sue Brooks
 Kamchatka directed by Marcelo Piñeyro
 Kitchen Stories directed by Bent Hamer
 Last Life in the Universe directed by Pen-ek Ratanaruang
 The Last Virgin directed by Joel Lamangan
 Loving Glances directed by Srđan Karanović
 The Magic Gloves directed by Martín Rejtman
 Where Is Madame Catherine? directed by Marc Recha
 Memories of Murder directed by Bong Joon-ho
 Milwaukee, Minnesota directed by Allan Mindel
 The Mother directed by Roger Michell
 My Life Without Me directed by Isabel Coixet
 Noi the Albino directed by Dagur Kári
 Nicotina directed by Hugo Rodríguez
 Nos enfants chéris directed by Benoît Cohen
 Osama directed by Siddiq Barmak
 Pieces of April directed by Peter Hedges
 Prey for Rock & Roll directed by Alex Steyermark
 The Principles of Lust directed by Penny Woolcock
 Prosti directed by Erik Matti
 PTU directed by Johnnie To
 Pupendo directed by Jan Hřebejk
 Purple Butterfly directed by Lou Ye
 Who Killed Bambi? directed by Gilles Marchand
 Ramblers directed by Nobuhiro Yamashita
 Remake directed by Dino Mustafić
 Remember Me, My Love directed by Gabriele Muccino
 The Return directed by Andrey Zvyagintsev
 Secret File directed by Paolo Benvenuti
 Shara directed by Naomi Kawase
 Silence Between Two Thoughts directed by Babak Payami
 So Far Away directed by Juan Carlos Tabío
 Al sur de Granada directed by Fernando Colomo
 Spring, Summer, Fall, Winter... and Spring directed by Kim Ki-duk
 Stander directed by Bronwen Hughes
 Stormy Weather directed by Sólveig Anspach
 Struggle directed by Ruth Mader
 SuperTex directed by Jan Schütte
 Testosterone directed by David Moreton
 All the Fine Promises directed by Jean-Paul Civeyrac
 Travellers and Magicians directed by Dzongsar Jamyang Khyentse Rinpoche
 Vibrator directed by Ryūichi Hiroki
 Vodka Lemon directed by Hiner Saleem
 What the Eye Doesn't See directed by Francisco José Lombardi
 Wilbur Wants to Kill Himself directed by Lone Scherfig
 Wonderland directed by James Cox
 Young Adam directed by David Mackenzie

Dialogues: Talking With Pictures
 Alien directed by Ridley Scott
 Bad Timing directed by Nicolas Roeg
 Ikiru directed by Akira Kurosawa
 Nashville directed by Robert Altman
 One from the Heart directed by Francis Ford Coppola
 Twenty Years Later directed by Eduardo Coutinho

Spotlight
 Clouds of May directed by Nuri Bilge Ceylan
 The Confession directed by Zeki Demirkubuz
 Uzak directed by Nuri Bilge Ceylan
 Encounter directed by Ömer Kavur
 Fate directed by Zeki Demirkubuz
 Anayurt Oteli directed by Ömer Kavur
 The Secret Face directed by Ömer Kavur
 Kasaba directed by Nuri Bilge Ceylan
 The Third Page directed by Zeki Demirkubuz

Discovery
 11:14 directed by Greg Marcks
 16 Years of Alcohol directed by Richard Jobson
 Ana and the Others directed by Celina Murga
 Christmas directed by Gregory King
 Les corps impatients directed by Xavier Giannoli
 Dallas 362 directed by Scott Caan
 Easy directed by Jane Weinstock
 The Green Butchers directed by Anders Thomas Jensen
 I Love Your Work directed by Adam Goldberg
 Love Me If You Dare directed by Yann Samuell
 Koktebel directed by Boris Khlebnikov and Alexei Popogrebski
 The Last Customer directed by Nanni Moretti
 Madness and Genius directed by Ryan Eslinger
 Maqbool directed by Vishal Bhardwaj
 My Father and I directed by Xu Jinglei
 My Town directed by Marek Lechki
 Matrubhoomi directed by Manish Jha
 Noviembre directed by Achero Mañas
 Rhinoceros Eyes directed by Aaron Woodley
 Rick directed by Curtiss Clayton
 Sexual Dependency directed by Rodrigo Bellott
 A Smile directed by Park Kyung-hee
 Ljeto u zlatnoj dolini directed by Srđan Vuletić
 This Little Life directed by Sarah Gavron
 The Triggerstreet.com Project

Masters
 Casa de los Babys directed by John Sayles
 Chokher Bali, A Passion Play directed by Rituparno Ghosh
 Come and Go directed by João César Monteiro
 Dying at Grace directed by Allan King
 Elephant directed by Gus Van Sant
 I'll Sleep When I'm Dead directed by Mike Hodges
 A Talking Picture directed by Manoel de Oliveira
 Le Temps du Loup directed by Michael Haneke
 Zatoichi directed by Takeshi Kitano

Midnight Madness
 Cypher directed by Vincenzo Natali
 End of the Century: The Story of the Ramones directed by Jim Fields and Michael Gramaglia
 Gozu directed by Takashi Miike
 The Grudge directed by Takashi Shimizu
 Haute Tension directed by Alexandre Aja
 Ong-Bak: Muay Thai Warrior directed by Prachya Pinkaew
 Save the Green Planet! directed by Jang Joon-hwan
 Undead directed by Peter Spierig and Michael Spierig
 Underworld directed by Len Wiseman

National Cinema
 Bus 174 directed by José Padilha
 Carandiru directed by Hector Babenco
 God Is Brazilian directed by Carlos Diegues
 The Man of the Year directed by José Henrique Fonseca
 Margarette's Feast directed by Renato Falcão
 The Middle of the World directed by Vicente Amorim
 The Storytellers directed by Eliane Caffé

Perspective Canada
 8:17 p.m. Darling Street (20h17, rue Darling) directed by Bernard Émond
 Animal Nightmares directed by Peter Lynch
 Aspiration directed by Constant Mentzas
 Bager directed by Tomi Grgicevic
 The Big Charade directed by Jesse McKeown
 The Bread Maker directed by Anita McGee
 The Corporation directed by Mark Achbar and Jennifer Abbott
 Déformation Personnelle directed by Jean-François Asselin
 Defile in Veil directed by Deco Dawson
 DNA directed by Jack Blum
 The Dog Walker directed by James Genn
 Emile directed by Carl Bessai
 Exposures directed by Matt Sinclair-Foreman
 An Eye for an Eye directed by David Rimmer
 Falling Angels directed by Scott Smith
 The Fever of the Western Nile directed by Deco Dawson
 Flyerman directed by Jeff Stephenson and Jason Tan
 The Garden directed by Jason Buxton
 Gaz Bar Blues directed by Louis Bélanger
 Grotesque directed by Wrik Mead
 Guest Room directed by Skander Halim
 her carnal longings directed by Izabella Pruska-Oldenhof
 Hollywood North directed by Peter O'Brian
 Imitations of Life directed by Mike Hoolboom
 In the Dark directed by Mike Hoolboom
 Jours en fleurs directed by Louise Bourque
 The Last Night directed by Mathieu Guez
 A Little Life directed by Elizabeth Murray
 Love, Sex and Eating the Bones directed by Sudz Sutherland
 The Magical Life of Long Tack Sam directed by Ann Marie Fleming
 Mardi (Quel jour était-ce?) directed by Lyne Charlebois
 Moccasin Flats directed by Randy Redroad
 Noël Blank directed by Jean-François Rivard
 Not a Fish Story directed by Anita Doron
 Nothing directed by Vincenzo Natali
 On the Corner directed by Nathaniel Geary
 Passages directed by John Price
 Perfect directed by Boris Rodriguez
 Pop Song directed by Charles Officer
 A Problem with Fear directed by Gary Burns
 Proteus directed by John Greyson
 Saskatchewan Part 2 directed by Brian Stockton
 The School directed by Ezra Krybus and Matthew Miller
 She Was Cuba directed by Ho Tam
 Shooting Star directed by Jason Britski
 Sometimes a Voice directed by Simon Davidson
 Song of Wreckage directed by Ryan Redford
 Terminal Venus directed by Alexandre Franchi
 Todd and the Book of Pure Evil directed by Craig D. Wallace
 Totem: The Return of the G'psgolox Pole directed by Gil Cardinal
 The Truth about Head directed by Dale Heslip
 Twist directed by Jacob Tierney
 Why the Anderson Children Didn't Come to Dinner directed by Jamie Travis
 Wildflowers directed by Geoffrey Uloth
 X Man directed by Christopher Hinton

Planet Africa
 Afropunk: The "Rock n Roll Nigger" Experience directed by James Spooner
 Dark directed by D.A. Bullock
 His/Her Story directed by Nzinga Kemp
 Histoire de Tresses directed by Jacqueline Kalimunda
 How to Get the Man's Foot Out of Your Ass directed by Mario Van Peebles
 Mille Mois directed by Faouzi Bensaïdi
 Moi et mon blanc directed by S. Pierre Yameogo
 One Love directed by Rick Elgood and Don Letts
 Outcry directed by Destau Damtou
 Short on Sugar directed by Joseph Anaya
 Le silence de la forêt directed by Didier Ouénangaré and Bassek ba Kobhio
 The Sky in Her Eyes directed by Ouida Smit and Madoda Ncayiyana
 Soldiers of the Rock directed by Norman Maake
 Strange & Charmed directed by Shari Frilot
 Valley of the Innocent directed by Branwen Okpako
 Les Yeux secs directed by Narjiss Nejjar

Real to Reel
 The Agronomist directed by Jonathan Demme
 Aileen: Life and Death of a Serial Killer directed by Nick Broomfield and Joan Churchill
 The Blonds directed by Albertina Carri
 Bright Leaves directed by Ross McElwee
 Destiny's Children directed by Pimmi Pândé
 Dream Cuisine directed by Li Ying
 Investigation into the Invisible World directed by Jean-Michel Roux
 Festival Express directed by Bob Smeaton
 The Five Obstructions directed by Lars von Trier and Jørgen Leth
 Game Over: Kasparov and the Machine directed by Vikram Jayanti
 Jesus, You Know directed by Ulrich Seidl
 Los Angeles Plays Itself directed by Thom Andersen
 Mayor of the Sunset Strip directed by George Hickenlooper
 Molly & Mobarak directed by Tom Zubrycki
 The Passion of María Elena directed by Mercedes Moncada
 The Revolution Will Not Be Televised directed by Kim Bartley and Donnacha O'Briain
 S21, La Machine de mort Khmère Rouge directed by Rithy Panh
 The Story of the Weeping Camel directed by Byambasuren Davaa and Luigi Falorni
 Tibet: Cry of the Snow Lion directed by Tom Peosay
 Tom Dowd and the Language of Music directed by Mark Moormann
 West of the Tracks, Part I: Rust directed by Wang Bing
 West of the Tracks, Part II: Remnants directed by Wang Bing
 West of the Tracks, Part III: Rails directed by Wang Bing
 The Yes Men directed by Dan Ollman, Sarah Price and Chris Smith

Special Presentations
 21 Grams directed by Alejandro González Iñárritu
 Alila directed by Amos Gitaï
 The Best of Youth directed by Marco Tullio Giordana
 Cheeky directed by David Thewlis
 Coffee and Cigarettes directed by Jim Jarmusch
 The Cooler directed by Wayne Kramer
 Dogville directed by Lars von Trier
 Far Side of the Moon directed by Robert Lepage
 The Fog of War directed by Errol Morris
 Go Further directed by Ron Mann
 The Gospel of John directed by Philip Saville
 La Grande Séduction directed by Jean-François Pouliot
 L' Histoire de Marie et Julien directed by Jacques Rivette
 Lost in Translation directed by Sofia Coppola
 Love Actually directed by Richard Curtis
 The Merry Widow directed by Erich von Stroheim
 Monsieur Ibrahim directed by François Dupeyron
 Père et fils directed by Michel Boujenah
 Raja directed by Jacques Doillon
 The Saddest Music in the World directed by Guy Maddin
 Les Sentiments directed by Noémie Lvovsky
 Shattered Glass directed by Billy Ray
 The Singing Detective directed by Keith Gordon
 The Snow Walker directed by Charles Martin Smith
 The Station Agent directed by Tom McCarthy
 Touching the Void directed by Kevin Macdonald
 Valentín directed by Alejandro Agresti
 Zhou Yu's Train directed by Sun Zhou

Visions
 Bright Future directed by Kiyoshi Kurosawa
 The Brown Bunny directed by Vincent Gallo
 Cremaster 3 directed by Matthew Barney
 Good Bye, Dragon Inn directed by Tsai Ming-liang
 Greendale directed by Bernard Shakey a.k.a. Neil Young
 In This World directed by Michael Winterbottom
 Nine Souls directed by Toshiaki Toyoda
 Des Plumes dans la tête directed by Thomas de Thier
 Sansa directed by Siegfried
 The Tesseract directed by Oxide Pang
 The Triplets of Belleville (Les Triplettes de Belleville) directed by Sylvain Chomet
 The Tulse Luper Suitcases, Episode 3. Antwerp directed by Peter Greenaway
 The Tulse Luper Suitcases, Part 1. The Moab Story directed by Peter Greenaway
 Twentynine Palms directed by Bruno Dumont

Wavelengths
 Bouquet 25 directed by Rose Lowder
 Chinese Series directed by Stan Brakhage
 Cocteau Cento directed by Dan Boord and Luis Valdovino
 Early Monthly Segments directed by Robert Beavers
 Fear of Blushing directed by Jennifer Reeves
 The Ground directed by Robert Beavers
 He Walked Away directed by Jennifer Reeves
 The Hedge Theater directed by Robert Beavers
 Horizontal Boundaries Second Projection directed by Pat O'Neill
 In the Garden directed by Ute Aurand and Bärbel Freund
 Interior directed by Jim Jennings
 Let's Make a Sandwich directed by Pat O'Neill
 Meditations on Revolution, Part V: Foreign City directed by Robert Fenz
 Megalopolis directed by Jim Jennings
 No directed by Sharon Lockhart
 Noor directed by Deborah Phillips
 Outline directed by Sandra Gibson
 Psalm III: "Night of the Meek" directed by Phil Solomon
 Quadro directed by Lotte Schreiber
 Rolling in My Ears directed by Barry Gerson
 Seasons directed by Phil Solomon and Stan Brakhage
 Stan's Window and Work in Progress directed by Stan Brakhage
 System of Transitions directed by Johannes Hammel
 Translucent Appearances directed by Barry Gerson
 The Visitation directed by Nathaniel Dorsky

Canada's Top Ten
TIFF's annual Canada's Top Ten list, its national critics and festival programmers poll of the ten best feature and short films of the year, was released in December 2003.

8:17 p.m. Darling Street (20h17 rue Darling) - Bernard Émond
The Barbarian Invasions (Les Invasion barbares) — Denys Arcand
The Corporation — Mark Achbar, Jennifer Abbott
Dying at Grace — Allan King
Falling Angels — Scott Smith
Far Side of the Moon (La Face cachée de la lune) — Robert Lepage
Love, Sex and Eating the Bones — Sudz Sutherland
My Life Without Me — Isabel Coixet
On the Corner — Nathaniel Geary
The Saddest Music in the World — Guy Maddin

References

External links
 Official site
 2003 Toronto International Film Festival at IMDb

2003 film festivals
2003
2003 in Toronto
2003 in Canadian cinema
2003 festivals in North America